The Virgin chub or the Virgin River chub (Gila seminuda) is a medium-sized, silvery minnow, generally less than 15 cm  long and reaching lengths of 25 cm. The back, breast, and part of the belly are embedded with small scales, naked in some individuals. The length of the head divided by the depth of the caudal peduncle typically results in a ratio of 4.0 to 5.0 (rarely exceeding 5.0, which approximates G. elegans). The scales are typically lacking basal radii or are with extremely faint lines.

Range

It is restricted to the Virgin River in Arizona, Nevada, and Utah. Another sizable population is found in the upper and middle reaches of the Muddy River in Nevada. The Arizona range of the Virgin chub is restricted to the Virgin River within Mohave County.

Habitat
In its native habitat, it occurs only in the mainstream of the Virgin and Muddy Rivers (Water within these rivers are generally somewhat warm, turbid, and saline), and very rarely in the immediate mouths of its major tributaries. The Virgin chub is most common in deeper areas where waters are swift, but not turbulent, and most often is associated with boulders or other types of cover.

Population trends 
The Virgin chub is continuing to decline. In 1988 an attempt to remove red shiners (which are a common competitor with the Virgin chub) from 35 km of habitat on the Virgin River, ended in failure as populations of Virgin chub continued to be decimated by other factors including habitat modifications.

Management factors 
Activities that are known to be detrimental to Virgin chub populations are the de-watering of habitats through the re-routing of stream water, stream impoundment, channelization, domestic livestock grazing, timber harvesting, mining, road construction, polluting, and stocking non-natives.

Threats: widespread modification and reduction of habitat; dewatering by agricultural diversion; increased temperature, salinity, and turbidity of the Virgin River; introduction of non-native fish and parasite species.

Management needs: protect and enhance habitat, including water quantity and quality; ameliorate effects of nonnative fish species in chub waters; re-establish additional populations.

Hybrid origin
The Virgin chub likely evolved via introgressive hybridization between the roundtail chub, G. robusta, and the bonytail chub, G. elegans.  Evidence for a hybrid origin of the Virgin chub is based on morphology and allozymes.  The mitochondrial DNA of the Virgin chub is nearly identical to that of G. elegans.

References

External links
  List of Arizona Native Fishes
  Arizona Desert Museum

Endangered fauna of the United States
Fish of the Western United States
Chubs (fish)
Gila (fish)
Fish described in 1875
Taxa named by Henry Crécy Yarrow
Species endangered by habitat loss